Mirjana Boševska (born June 25, 1981, in Skopje) is a retired female freestyle and medley swimmer from Macedonia. She twice competed for her native country at the Summer Olympics: 1996 and 2000. She was the first woman to represent Macedonia at the Olympics. She swam for the University of Virginia and was a first team All-American four years in a row.

References 

1981 births
Living people
Macedonian female freestyle swimmers
Female medley swimmers
Swimmers at the 1996 Summer Olympics
Swimmers at the 2000 Summer Olympics
Macedonian female swimmers
Olympic swimmers of North Macedonia
University of Virginia alumni
Sportspeople from Skopje